The Muskogee Public School district (officially known as Muskogee Independent School District No. 20) is the primary public school district in Muskogee, Oklahoma. Their mascot is the Rougher, an anthropomorphic bulldog. The district is governed by a five-member Muskogee Board of Education, with members being elected to serve staggered five year terms. The Board in turn appoints a Superintendent to be the chief administrative officer of the district.

Schools
There is one early childhood center, one virtual school,  six elementary schools, and four secondary schools in the Muskogee Public School District.

Secondary:
Muskogee High School
Rougher Alternative Academy, an alternative school

Muskogee 8th and 9th Grade Academy at Alice Robertson
Muskogee 6th and 7th Grade Academy at Ben Franklin

Elementary:
NewTech @ Cherokee Elementary
Creek Elementary
Pershing Elementary
Sadler Arts Academy, housed in the NRHP-listed Manual Training High School for Negroes
Tony Goetz Elementary
Irving Elementary

Early Childhood Centers:
Muskogee Early Childhood Center
Virtual School:

 Roughers Innovations Academy (3rd-12th)

References

External links
Muskogee Public Schools homepage

School districts in Oklahoma
Muskogee, Oklahoma
Education in Muskogee County, Oklahoma